Resuscitation Council UK (RCUK) is a healthcare charity focused on resuscitation education and training for healthcare professionals and bystander CPR awareness for the public. It is the United Kingdom body responsible for setting central standards for CPR and related disciplines. RCUK is a member of the European Resuscitation Council, which is part of the international standards body, the International Liaison Committee on Resuscitation (ILCOR).

History
Resuscitation Council UK was formed in 1981 by a group of medical professionals with a shared interest in research-based resuscitation methods and instruction. Its objective is to educate both the general public and health care professionals in the most effective resuscitation methods. RCUK's resuscitation guidelines and quality standards provide guidance for healthcare professionals regarding adult, paediatric and newborn resuscitation. The organisation has an established set of professional training courses that operate across the UK and train healthcare professionals in immediate and advanced life support.

In more recent years, Resuscitation Council UK has also been involved in various campaigns to support the public in learning CPR. RCUK leads the UK's effort on Restart a Heart Day, working with St John Ambulance, NHS Ambulance Services, British Heart Foundation, British Red Cross and the Saving Lives for Scotland to raise awareness of out-of-hospital cardiac arrest and encourage people to learn CPR skills.

RCUK also works to raise awareness of the importance of CPR decision-making, and has developed the Recommended Summary Plan for Emergency Care and Treatment (ReSPECT) Process, which has been adopted in numerous regions across the UK.

Aims
Resuscitation Council UK aims to:
 establish appropriate guidelines for resuscitation
 encourage members of the public to respond quickly to an emergency and learn CPR skills
 encourage research into methods of resuscitation
 promote the teaching of resuscitation as established in the guidelines
 establish and maintain standards for resuscitation
 develop community partnerships and tackle health inequality in the UK

References

External links
 Resuscitation Council UK Official Website
 European Resuscitation Council Official Website

Emergency medicine education
Emergency medicine organisations
Health in the London Borough of Camden
Heart disease organizations
Medical and health organisations based in the United Kingdom
Organisations based in the London Borough of Camden